The following is a list of events affecting Pakistani television in 2005. Events listed include television show debuts, and finales; channel launches, and closures; stations changing or adding their network affiliations; and information about changes of ownership of channels or stations.

Television programs

Programs debuting in 2005

References